Fontas Airport  was located  northeast of Fontas, Alberta, Canada.

References

External links
Place to Fly on COPA's Places to Fly airport directory

Defunct airports in Alberta
County of Northern Lights